Maua is a genus of cicadas from Southeast Asia. The males possess two pairs of dark ventral abdominal tubercles on third and fourth sternites.

In 2000, Kos and Gogala expressed the opinion that it was likely that the Maua as it was then constructed was interlineated with the genus Purana as the criteria used by Distant in separating them were not reflective of the phylogenetic relations of the species included. In 2010, Lee and Hill redefined the Cicadini subtribe Leptopsaltriina Moulton, 1923, as well as a number of other relationships in the Asian Cicadidae, placing both Maua and Purana in Leptopsaltriina, along with several other genera.

List of species

Maua affinis Distant, 1905
Maua albigutta (Walker, 1856)
Maua albistigma (Walker, 1850)
Maua borneensis Duffels, 2009
Maua latilinea (Walker, 1868)
Maua linggana Moulton, 1923
Maua palawanensis Duffels, 2009
Maua quadrituberculata (Signoret, 1847)

References

Hemiptera of Asia
Leptopsaltriini
Cicadidae genera